Olberg is a populated place situated in Pinal County, Arizona, United States. The settlement was founded in 1903, and named after Colonel C.R. Olberg, the chief engineer of the Bureau of Indian Affairs (BIA), and as such supervised the construction of the Coolidge Dam which was built by the BIA.

References

Populated places in Pinal County, Arizona